James T. Haadsma (born January 27, 1958) is a Democratic member of the Michigan House of Representatives.

Before being elected to the state legislature, Haadsma was admitted to the State Bar of Michigan in 1984.

References

External links 
 Jim Haadsma at housedems.org

Living people
Michigan State University alumni
Wayne State University Law School alumni
Democratic Party members of the Michigan House of Representatives
Michigan lawyers
21st-century American lawyers
21st-century American politicians
20th-century American lawyers
1958 births